Gyumri Shirak International Airport,  is an international airport serving Gyumri and the province of Shirak, Armenia. The airport was inaugurated in 1961, and is the second largest airport in the country, after Yerevan's Zvartnots International Airport.

History
The airport terminal was built in 1982 by architects Levon Christophorian and Ruben Asratyan. However, after the earthquake in 1988, the airport became largely inoperable and practically unused until it was partially renewed in 2004. At the start of 2006, Armenia felt the importance of having a second airport, when adverse weather conditions meant that many flights had to be diverted from Yerevan's Zvartnots International Airport into Gyumri's Shirak Airport. New radar systems that allow aircraft identification within a  radius were installed in 2006. In 2007, the runway underwent major repairs and was completely re-asphalted. A new Finnish IDMAN light-signal system has been installed since, and repair works have been carried out in the ramp and special ground handling technics have been imported. In 2007 the General Department of Civil Aviation of the Government of Armenia granted Shirak airport an ICAO First Class Airport license.  A new arrivals area was inaugurated on September 16, 2021, increasing the airport's capacity to 700,000 passengers per year.

Overview 
Runway 02 is equipped with an ILS CAT I, enabling aircraft operations in low ceiling (60 meters) and visibility (800 meters). The airport is also equipped with a new air traffic control tower and a boiler room, as well as a new arrivals area including five passport control booths and an additional baggage carousel. The airport features a Dufry duty-free shop after security in the departures area. Runway resurfacing works were completed on September 16, 2021, as part of a large-scale modernisation program for the airport.

The airport also serves as an airbase for the Armenian Air Force, which has a large maintenance and operations base with several combat and training aircraft stationed at the north-east of the airfield.

Airlines and destinations

Statistics

See also
 Transport in Armenia
 List of the busiest airports in Armenia
 List of the busiest airports in the former USSR

References

External links

 General Department of Civil Aviation of Armenia - airport information 

Airports built in the Soviet Union
Airports in Armenia
Buildings and structures in Gyumri
Airports established in 1961
1961 establishments in Armenia